Henry Woolhouse (1867–1911) was an English footballer who played in the Football League for The Wednesday.

References

1867 births
1911 deaths
English footballers
Association football forwards
English Football League players
Sheffield F.C. players
Sheffield Wednesday F.C. players
FA Cup Final players